Korthalsella rubra (common name - Jointed mistletoe) is a flowering plant in the Santalaceae (sandalwood) family, formerly placed in the Viscaceae.

Description
It grows to about 16 cm, and has distinctive green to yellow-green segmented branches which are flattened. The minute flowers are found within cushions at the nodes between the segments, separating into the edges as the segments grow larger.

Distribution
It is found in eastern Australia from Gippsland (Victoria) to Cape York (Queensland).

Ecology
It is a host plant for the butterfly, Delias nysa, and can be found on some 25 or more different host species.

Taxonomy
It was first described as Bifaria rubra by Philippe Édouard Léon Van Tieghem in 1896. In 1897, Adolf Engler assigned it to the genus, Korthalsella, renaming it, Korthalsella rubra. This taxonomy is accepted by the CHAH, but others consider it a synonym of Korthalsella japonica f. rubra (Tiegh.) Molvray.

Australian taxonomic sources accept two subspecies, Korthalsella rubra (Tiegh.) Engl. subsp. rubra, and Korthalsella rubra subsp. geijericola Barlow.

References

External links
 Korthalsella rubra Occurrence data from the Australasian Virtual Herbarium

Santalaceae
Flora of New South Wales
Parasitic plants
Plants described in 1896
rubra